Sharpless Homestead, also known as Radley Farm, is a historic home and farm located in Birmingham Township, Chester County, Pennsylvania. It includes four green serpentine stone vernacular buildings built between about 1790 and 1860.  They are the farmhouse, stable, springhouse, and smoke house.  The main section of the farmhouse was built about 1790 and rebuilt in 1860.  It is a -story, four bay, serpentine structure.  The three-story, three bay, east section was added about 1820, and the two-story northeast section was added about 1831. It is the birthplace of Isaac Sharpless, professor and president of Haverford College.

It was added to the National Register of Historic Places in 2011.

References

Houses on the National Register of Historic Places in Pennsylvania
Houses completed in 1860
Houses in Chester County, Pennsylvania
National Register of Historic Places in Chester County, Pennsylvania